Kathy Postlewait (born November 11, 1949) is an American professional golfer who played on the LPGA Tour.

Postlewait won four times on the LPGA Tour between 1983 and 1989.

Professional wins

LPGA Tour wins (4)

LPGA Tour playoff record (1–4)

References

External links

American female golfers
LPGA Tour golfers
Golfers from Virginia
East Carolina University alumni
Sportspeople from Norfolk, Virginia
1949 births
Living people
21st-century American women